Gene Brewer (born Eugene N. Brewer, July 4, 1937) is an American writer, the author of the K-PAX book series, about a man who claims to be a visiting extraterrestrial from a planet called K-PAX: K-PAX (1995), On a Beam of Light (2001), K-PAX III: The Worlds of Prot (2002), K-PAX IV (2007) and Prot's Report, a brief natural history of the Earth, which appears in K-PAX: The Trilogy, an omnibus edition of the first three K-PAX books. The first book in the series was made into a film in 2001; it stars Kevin Spacey and Jeff Bridges.

Biography
Brewer was born in Muncie, Indiana.

He was educated at DePauw University and University of Wisconsin–Madison, and he studied DNA replication and cell division, then became a novelist.

Brewer currently lives in New York City and Vermont with his wife.

Bibliography
 K-PAX: The Trilogy (2003). New York: Bloomsbury USA, . (Omnibus featuring "Prot's Report")
 En un Rayo de Luz (2003) Umbriel, . (Spanish trans. of On a Beam of Light)
 Creating K-PAX, Or, Are You Sure You Want to Be a Writer? (2005) Xlibris, . A memoir concerning the 2001 lawsuit over the film Man Facing Southeast.
 Murder on Spruce Island: A Louis B. Davenport Mystery (2006), Xlibris, .
 Wrongful Death: A Novel in Dialogue (2006) Xlibris, .
 Ben and I: A Christmas Story (2006) Xlibris, .
 Watson's God: A Novel (2007) Xlibris, .
 Three Stories and a Novella: For All Ages (2007) .
 The American Way: A Politically Incorrect Satire (2007), Xlibris, .
 K-Pax Redux: A Play, Screenplay, and a Report (2007) Xlibris, .
 3 Early Novels (2007), Xlibris, .
 Becoming Human (2013), Xlibris .

References

External links

20th-century American novelists
20th-century American male writers
21st-century American novelists
American male novelists
American memoirists
American science fiction writers
1937 births
Living people
People from Muncie, Indiana
21st-century American male writers
20th-century American non-fiction writers
21st-century American non-fiction writers
American male non-fiction writers